Ace Banzuelo (born August 10, 2004) is a Filipino singer, songwriter and musician. He gained mainstream popularity of his song "Muli". He is currently signed under Sony Music Philippines.

Early life 
Banzuelo was born and raised in Laguna. He started singing as the age of 4, he was influence of Hip-hop music but after years he constantly joining local auditions, singing contests and television shows. And he turned 13, he was already writing and producing his own recordings as he also began to experiment with different genres.

Banzuelo has cited Michael Jackson because he was young, he loved dancing.

Discography

Singles 

 If You Only Knew - released in 2018
 Like Like You - released in 2018
 High On You - released in 2019
 Tayo Na Lang - released in 2019
 Tala - released in 2019
 Seresa - released in 2019
 Malayo - released in 2020
 Muli - released in 2020
 Safe - released in 2020
 Himala - released in 2020
 Mayari - released in 2021
 Alive - released in 2021
 Babae - released in 2022
 Walang Himala - released in 2022
 Kulang - released in 2022
 Tadhana - released in 2023

References

External links 

 
 

Living people
Filipino singer-songwriters
Year of birth missing (living people)